The 2013 United States Senate special election in New Jersey was held on October 16, 2013, to fill the New Jersey United States Senate Class 2 seat for the remainder of the term ending January 3, 2015. The vacancy resulted from the death of five-term Democratic senator Frank Lautenberg on June 3, 2013. On June 4, 2013, New Jersey Governor Chris Christie announced that a primary election to fill the vacancy would take place on August 13, 2013 and that a special election would follow on October 16, 2013. New Jersey governor Chris Christie appointed Republican New Jersey Attorney General Jeffrey Chiesa to the seat as a placeholder; Chiesa announced at the time of his appointment that he would not be a candidate in the special election.

The primary elections were won by Republican former Bogota Mayor Steve Lonegan and Democratic Newark Mayor Cory Booker. Booker defeated Lonegan on October 16, 2013, and became the first African-American elected to statewide office in New Jersey.

Background 
Democrats and Republicans interested in running in the special primary were given six days, until June 10, to collect 1,000 signatures in order to appear on the special primary ballots. Christie was criticized for spending millions of dollars to hold a separate election for Senate, despite the gubernatorial election already being scheduled for November. It was thought that Christie took this action to benefit himself politically, believing that likely Democratic nominee Cory Booker's presence on the ballot would inspire higher turnout from minority voters who would also vote for Christie's Democratic gubernatorial opponent, Barbara Buono.

On June 6, 2013, Christie appointed Republican Attorney General Jeffrey Chiesa to fill the Senate vacancy; Chiesa announced that he would not be a candidate in the special election.

On June 13, 2013, the Appellate Division of the New Jersey Superior Court unanimously rejected the Democrats' challenge, which was brought by Somerset County Democratic chairwoman Marguerite M. Schaffer, to force Christie to change the special election date in October to the general election on November 5. They ruled "the Legislature has delegated broad authority to the State's governor" to set the election date. On June 20, 2013, the New Jersey Supreme Court declined to hear a follow-up challenge to the special election date.

Democratic state senator Shirley Turner, of Lawrenceville, New Jersey introduced legislation to move the general election on November 5 for all statewide offices, including governor, to the same date, October 16, as the U.S. Senate special election. This legislation was introduced in order to avoid spending an additional $12 million for a separate U.S. Senate election in October in addition to the general statewide election in November. A bill, A4237, passed both legislative houses on June 27, 2013. Another bill, A4249, allowing eligible voters who cast ballots on October 16 for senator to also vote early for the November general election, finally passed both legislative houses on June 27. Both bills were sent to Governor Christie for approval or veto with little expectation that either would be signed by Christie into law. The governor vetoed both bills on September 9, 2013.

The Christie administration looked into contingency plan options for additional state workers, transportation resources, voting machines and associated hardware, and skilled voting machine technicians in order to avoid any potential conflicts due to the short time span of 20 days between the special election and the general election. Use of any of these options would increase the cost of $12 million for the October election, which would be in addition to $12 million for the August primary, that were both estimated by the New Jersey Office of Legislative Services. Contingency plans would be needed due to potential scheduling and logistical conflicts in the use of the same voting machines for both elections. New Jersey state law requires voting machines to be locked down for 15 days after an election, in case a defeated candidate seeks a recount. Voting machines would also need to be set up several days in advance of the general election. The state has made arrangements to reimburse by December 31, 2013 all necessary expenses after an audit of submitted election costs by each of the County Boards of Elections.

Republican primary

Candidates

Declared 
 Alieta Eck, former president of the Association of American Physicians and Surgeons, founder of the Zarephath Health Center and health care reform advocate
 Steve Lonegan, former mayor of Bogota, former state director of Americans for Prosperity and candidate for governor in 2005 and 2009

Declined 
 Jennifer Beck, state senator
 Jon Bramnick, Minority Leader of the New Jersey State Assembly
 Jeffrey Chiesa, incumbent U.S. senator
 Michael J. Doherty, state senator
 Thomas Kean Jr., Minority Leader of the New Jersey Senate and nominee for U.S. Senate in 2006
 Joe Kyrillos, state senator and nominee for the U.S. Senate in 2012
 Leonard Lance, U.S. Representative
 Kevin J. O'Toole, state senator
 Geraldo Rivera, talk show host

Endorsements

Polling

Results

Democratic primary

Candidates

Declared 
 Cory Booker, Mayor of Newark
 Rush Holt Jr., U.S. Representative
 Sheila Oliver, Speaker of the New Jersey General Assembly
 Frank Pallone, U.S. Representative

Declined 
 Rob Andrews, U.S. Representative
 Beth Mason, Hoboken City Councilwoman
 Stephen M. Sweeney, president of the New Jersey Senate

Endorsements

Debates 
 Complete video of debate, August 5, 2013 - C-SPAN

Polling

Results

Special election 
Booker enjoyed advantages over Lonegan in fundraising and name recognition. However, he was scrutinized regarding "his personal finances and the terms of his departure from law firm Trenk DiPasquale; the viability of his video startup, Waywire, and the investors behind it; and his behavior on Twitter, including messages to an Oregon stripper". Booker "also drew criticism from the left over his progressive credentials." Booker painted Lonegan as a "tea-party extremist", while Lonegan questioned Booker's performance as Mayor of Newark.

Candidates

Major party candidates 
 Cory Booker (Democratic), Mayor of Newark
 Steve Lonegan (Republican), former mayor of Bogota, former state director of Americans for Prosperity and candidate for governor in 2005 and 2009

Other candidates 
 Robert Depasquale, Independent
 Eugene M. LaVergne, D-R Party
 Stuart Meissner, Alimony Reform Now
 Pablo Olivera, Unity is Strength
 Antonio N. Sabas, Independent
 Edward C. Stackhouse, Jr., Ed the Barber

Debates 
 Complete video of debate, October 9, 2013 - C-SPAN

Fundraising

Top contributors

Top industries

Polling 

With Holt, Jr.

With Oliver

With Pallone

Results 

Booker defeated Lonegan on October 16, 2013. Booker resigned as Mayor of Newark on October 30, 2013 and was sworn in on October 31, 2013 as the junior U.S. senator from New Jersey.

Results by congressional district
Booker 6 of the 12 congressional districts.

See also 

 2013 United States Senate special election in Massachusetts
 2014 United States Senate election in New Jersey

References

External links 
 Steve Lonegan Campaign Website
 Cory Booker Campaign Website

Cory Booker
2013
United States Senate
New Jersey
New Jersey 2013
New Jersey 2013
United States Senate 2013